Margarita Laso (born July 20, 1963), is an Ecuadorian singer, writer and producer. Laso specialises in the interpretation of songs based on traditional and regional genres of Ecuador and popular songs.

Career 
Laso began her musical training listening to her father sing tangos and tunes, boleros and songs from Ecuador. At the age of eight, she began her studies of piano and later of guitar, and later studied singing with Blanca Hauser.

In 1989, she performed her first stage production as a soloist and since then she has given recitals, shows and recordings throughout Ecuador with a repertoire that includes boleros, traditional Latin American and Ecuadorian music, carols and tangos. With several awards throughout her professional career, she has directed her work to the growth of local and national artistic activity and the expansion of Ecuadorian and Latin American music. She has recorded 12 CDs with various themes.

She worked as an editor for several publications and has published five poetry books. She participates in readings, recitals and international meetings of writers and poets. In 1997, she won the Jorge Carrera Andrade National Poetry Prize for her book The Line of Cobras.

She is also a columnist for the Hoy newspaper of Quito.

Selected works 

 1991 – Erosonera
 1994 – Queden en la lengua mis deseos
 1997 – El trazo de las cobras
 2004 – Los lobos desarmados
 2012 – La fiera consecuente

Discography

Albums 
 1992 – Luna desnuda. 
 1997 – Canciones de cuna y villancicos
 1998 – Apostemos que me caso
 2002 – Más bueno que el pan
 2005 – El Canelazo
 2009 – Fiestas de Navidad
 Villancicos Canciones de Cuna

Single and EPs 
 1991 – Piel de Trigo

Others 
 2000 – Gallito Verde. (Christmas Carol)
 2009 – Vivir en este Carpuela (Ecuadorian songs)
 2009 – Manito de Cera. (Christmas Latinoamericans songs)
 2009 – Garganta con Arena. (Tangos)
 2009 – Corazoncito. (Ecuadorian songs)

Poems 
 The Lions' Abattoir
 Cold Blood
 Lotus
 Ferris Wheel
 Parakeets
 At the pole the pelt hunters stalk seals

References 

Living people
1963 births
20th-century Ecuadorian women singers
21st-century Ecuadorian women singers